Plagia (old name:  Ususlu / Boguklu) is a village in the Kilkis region of Greece. It is situated in the municipal unit of Cherso, in the Kilkis municipality, within the Kilkis region of Central Macedonia.

Geography 
The village is located 15 km north of Kilkis in the Thessaloniki plain. Cherso is 6 km to the west, and Koromilia is 3 km to the south, with Milochori, Kilkis 4 km to the east.

The terrain around Plagia is hilly to the northeast, but to the southwest it is flat.   The highest point nearby is 438 metres above sea level, 1.5 km east of Plagia.  Around Plagia it is quite sparsely populated, with 40 inhabitants per square kilometre.  The nearest major community is Kilkis , 12.6 km south of Plagia. The area around Plagia consists mostly of agricultural land. 

The climate in the area is temperate . Average annual temperature in the neighbourhood is 15  ° C . The warmest month is August, when the average temperature is 28 ° C, and the coldest is December, with 2 ° C.   Average annual rainfall is 984 millimetres. The wettest month is February, with an average of 137 mm of precipitation , and the driest is August, with 32 mm of precipitation.

History

Notes and citations
Notes

Citations

Populated places in Kilkis (regional unit)